Events in the year 1983 in Bulgaria.

Incumbents 

 General Secretaries of the Bulgarian Communist Party: Todor Zhivkov
 Chairmen of the Council of Ministers: Grisha Filipov

Events 

 The 1983 Winter Universiade, the XI Winter Universiade, took place in Sofia, Bulgaria. This was one of only four Universiades since Winter 1981 with no official mascot.

References 

 
1980s in Bulgaria
Years of the 20th century in Bulgaria
Bulgaria
Bulgaria